Mobi Patrick Oparaku  (born 1 December 1976) is a Nigerian former professional footballer who played as a defender.

Club career 
Oparaku was born in Owerri, Imo State. He played for several clubs in Belgium. In 2000, Oparaku spent one season with the El Paso Patriots in the USL A-League. In 2001, he played for the Connecticut Wolves. In December 2005 he returned to Nigeria with teammate Rashidi Yekini to Gateway F.C.

International career 
Oparaku played six matches at 1993 FIFA U-17 World Championship.

For the Nigeria senior national team, he was a participant at the 1996 Olympic Games, where Nigeria won the gold medal and at the 1998 FIFA World Cup.

References

External links
 

1976 births
Living people
People from Owerri
Nigerian footballers
Association football defenders
Nigeria international footballers
Olympic footballers of Nigeria
Olympic gold medalists for Nigeria
Footballers at the 1996 Summer Olympics
Olympic medalists in football
Medalists at the 1996 Summer Olympics
1998 FIFA World Cup players
Challenger Pro League players
A-League (1995–2004) players
Heartland F.C. players
R.S.C. Anderlecht players
KFC Turnhout players
Royal Cappellen F.C. players
El Paso Patriots players
Connecticut Wolves players
Rivoli United F.C. players
Gateway United F.C. players
Enyimba F.C. players
Nigerian expatriate footballers
Nigerian expatriate sportspeople in Belgium
Expatriate footballers in Belgium
Nigerian expatriate sportspeople in the United States
Expatriate soccer players in the United States
Nigerian expatriate sportspeople in Jamaica
Expatriate footballers in Jamaica
Sportspeople from Imo State